Aleksandr Nikolayevich Lebedev (born 10 October 1984) is a retired rower. Competing the eights he won a silver medal at the 2008 European Championships and placed tenth at the 2009 World Championships.

Career

References 

1984 births
Living people
Russian male rowers
European Rowing Championships medalists